Peter Maker Manyang (born 1 January 1994), known as Peter Maker, is a South Sudanese footballer who plays as a midfielder for Zambia Super League club ZESCO United F.C. and captains the South Sudan national team.

References

External links

1994 births
Living people
People from Juba
South Sudanese footballers
Association football midfielders
South Sudan international footballers